The 2016–17 Cal State Bakersfield Roadrunners men's basketball team represented California State University, Bakersfield during the 2016–17 NCAA Division I men's basketball season. The Roadrunners, led by sixth-year head coach Rod Barnes, played their home games at the Icardo Center as members of the Western Athletic Conference. They finished the season 25–10, 12–2 in WAC play to win the regular season WAC championship. They defeated Utah Valley to advance to the championship game of the WAC tournament where they lost to New Mexico State. As a regular season conference champion who failed to win their conference tournament, they received an automatic bid to the National Invitation Tournament. As a No. 8 seed, they defeated California, Colorado State, and Texas–Arlington to become the first No. 8 seed to advance to the semifinals since the NIT introduced seeding in 2006. In the semifinals at Madison Square Garden they lost to Georgia Tech.

Previous season 
The Roadrunners finished the 2015–16 season 24–9, 11–3 in WAC play to finish in a tie for second place. They defeated Chicago State, Seattle, and New Mexico State to win the WAC tournament. As a result, they earned the conference's automatic bid to the NCAA tournament, their first ever appearance, where they lost in the first round to Oklahoma.

Offseason

Departures

Incoming transfers

2016 incoming recruits

2017 recruiting class

2018 recruiting class

Roster

Schedule and results

|-
!colspan=9 style=| Exhibition

|-
!colspan=9 style=| Non-conference regular season

|-
!colspan=9 style=| WAC regular season

|-
!colspan=9 style=| WAC tournament

|-
!colspan=9 style=| NIT

References

Cal State Bakersfield Roadrunners men's basketball seasons
Cal State Bakersfield
Cal State Bakersfield